Foy H. Moody High School is a public high school located in the city of Corpus Christi, Texas and classified as a 5A school by the UIL.  It is a part of the Corpus Christi Independent School District located in southeast Nueces County.  In 2015, the school was rated "Met Standard" by the Texas Education Agency.

Athletics
The Moody Trojans compete in the following sports: Volleyball, Cross Country, Football, Basketball, Wrestling, Powerlifting, Swimming, Soccer, Golf, Tennis, Track, Baseball & Softball

State Titles
Baseball - 
2004(5A), 2007(4A)
Boys Track - 
1968(2A)

References

External links
Corpus Christi ISD

Corpus Christi Independent School District high schools
Educational institutions established in 1967
High schools in Corpus Christi, Texas
1967 establishments in Texas